The 1993 Colorado Buffaloes football team represented the University of Colorado at Boulder in the 1993 NCAA Division I-A football season. The team was led by head coach Bill McCartney and played their home games at Folsom Field in Boulder, Colorado. The Buffaloes participated as members of the Big 8 Conference.

Schedule

Roster

Season summary

Missouri

at No. 9 Oklahoma

No. 6 Nebraska

vs. No. 25 Fresno State (Aloha Bowl)

References

Colorado
Colorado Buffaloes football seasons
Aloha Bowl champion seasons
Colorado Buffaloes football